Pabna Medical College is a government medical school in Bangladesh, established in 2008. It is located in Hemayetpur, Pabna.
The college provides a five-year MBBS degree and a one-year internship after graduation for all graduates. The degree is recognized by the Bangladesh Medical and Dental Council.

History

Pabna Medical College was established in 2008 with a view to fulfilling the basic medical demands of the people of the district and elsewhere. Classes began in 2009 in the temporary cottages of the Pabna Mental Hospital.

In 2015, the modern six-story academic building was inaugurated by Prime Minister Sheikh Hasina. In 2018, construction on separate hostels for both boys and girls began in order to accommodate the increasing number of medical students every year. The preliminary work of creating 500-bed hospital has been completed.

Campus
 
The Pabna Medical College campus covers a large area of land encompassing a vast six-story academic building with all modern amenities. The academic building consists of separate departments for all disciplines. It also has dissection halls, classrooms, well-equipped laboratories etc. The Tanija Haidar Auditorium is used for almost every meeting, seminar and symposium on campus. It was named after Tanija Haidar, a student of the ninth cohort of the college, who was killed in a traffic accident in Pabna. The academic building also has a library with a large collection of both medical and non-medical books and magazines for students and teachers.

The library provides uninterrupted access to the internet. Also, there is an indoor sports room just beside the library in which table tennis is mostly practiced. The academic building also consists of a canteen named "Zara Canteen and Restaurant" in the ground floor in order to facilitate the students of the dining facilities.

Apart from the academic building, there is a Shahid Minar to commemorate the sacrifices made by the martyrs of the Great Language Movement of 1952.The Pabna Medical College family places floral homage to the martyrs every year on the occasion of 21 February or "The International Mother Language Day". There are a two-storied and a three-storied hostel building for the male and female students respectively. Massive tree plantation programme has been implemented in and around the campus. The Pabna Medical College campus also has a nuclear medicine centre. It is only one of the country's six medical colleges to be privileged to have one nuclear medicine centre.

There is a pond in the campus which is fondly called "Sagorika"(meaning a miniature of sea) by the PMC students. The college compound also includes two large playgrounds where various kind of sporting events take place.

See also
 List of medical colleges in Bangladesh

Medical colleges in Bangladesh
Hospitals in Bangladesh
Educational institutions established in 2008
2008 establishments in Bangladesh
Organisations based in Pabna
Education in Pabna District